The 2018 Goiás gubernatorial election was held in October 2018 and elected the Governor and Vice Governor of Goiás and 41 State Deputies.
 
Governor Marconi Perillo was re-elected in the 2014 Brazilian general elections but resigned to run for the Federal Senate and is barred from running for his fifth non-consecutive term because of Brazilian electoral law and the Constitution, as he was re-elected in the previous election, and Lieutenant Governor José Eliton took over the State Government by the end of the year.

Gubernatorial candidates

Confirmed candidates

Senate candidates

Confirmed candidates 

In alphabetic order.

Alessandro Aquino (PCO)
Agenor Mariano (MDB)
Fabrício Rosa (PSOL)
Geli Sanches (PT)
Jorge Kajuru (PRP)
Lúcia Vânia Abrão Costa (PSB)
Luís César Bueno (PT)
Magda Borges (PCB)
Marconi Perillo (PSDB)
Santana Pires (PAT)
Vanderlan Cardoso (PP)
Wilder Morais (DEM)

References

2018 Brazilian gubernatorial elections
October 2018 events in South America
Politics of Goiás
Goiás gubernatorial elections